Emmaljunga is a locality situated in Hässleholm Municipality, Skåne County, Sweden with 262 inhabitants in 2010. It lies on Highway 117 which connects it directly with Hässleholm in the south. The town was founded in 1925.

Emmaljunga Barnvagnsfabrik, the oldest manufacturer of baby strollers in Europe, was founded in Emmaljunga in 1925. It is still owned by its founders, the Persson family.

References 

Populated places in Hässleholm Municipality
Populated places in Skåne County
Populated places established in 1925